The Union of Printing, Journalism, and Paper (commonly abbreviated DJP) was an Austrian trade union.

History
The Printer's Union began in 1842 with the establishment of the Association for the Support of Sick Printers and Type designers in Vienna.  The union was banned in the 1930s, but was re-established by the Austrian Trade Union Federation in 1945.  By 1998, it had 18,023 members.

The union merged with the Union of Private Sector Employees in 2007 to become the GPA-DJP, the nation's largest union.  At that time of its dissolution it was the oldest trade union in Austria.

Presidents
1945: Adolf Weigelt

1977: Herbert Bruna
1993: Franz Bittner

References

Trade unions in Austria
Printing trade unions
Trade unions established in the 1840s
Trade unions disestablished in 2007
1842 establishments in the Austrian Empire
2007 disestablishments in Austria